Gregory Gerard Huntington (born September 22, 1970) is a former American football center in the National Football League for the Washington Redskins, the Jacksonville Jaguars, and the Chicago Bears.  He played college football at Penn State University and was drafted in the fifth round of the 1993 NFL Draft. His nickname is The Mangler.

1970 births
Living people
Players of American football from Birmingham, Alabama
American football centers
Penn State Nittany Lions football players
Washington Redskins players
Jacksonville Jaguars players
Chicago Bears players